Proteales is an order of flowering plants consisting of three (or four) families which has been recognized by almost all taxonomists. The representatives of the Proteales can be very different from each other – the order contains plants that do not look alike at all. What they have in common is seeds with little or no endosperm, and the ovules are often atropic. The anthophytes are a grouping of plant taxa bearing flower-like reproductive structures. They were formerly thought to be a clade comprising plants bearing flower-like structures.  The group contained the angiosperms - the extant flowering plants, such as roses and grasses - as well as the Gnetales and the extinct Bennettitales.

23,420 species of vascular plant have been recorded in South Africa, making it the sixth most species-rich country in the world and the most species-rich country on the African continent. Of these, 153 species are considered to be threatened. Nine biomes have been described in South Africa: Fynbos, Succulent Karoo, desert, Nama Karoo, grassland, savanna, Albany thickets, the Indian Ocean coastal belt, and forests.

The 2018 South African National Biodiversity Institute's National Biodiversity Assessment plant checklist lists 35,130 taxa in the phyla Anthocerotophyta (hornworts (6)), Anthophyta (flowering plants (33534)), Bryophyta (mosses (685)), Cycadophyta (cycads (42)), Lycopodiophyta (Lycophytes(45)), Marchantiophyta (liverworts (376)), Pinophyta (conifers (33)), and Pteridophyta (cryptogams (408)).

Two families are represented in the literature. Listed taxa include species, subspecies, varieties, and forms as recorded, some of which have subsequently been allocated to other taxa as synonyms, in which cases the accepted taxon is appended to the listing. Multiple entries under alternative names reflect taxonomic revision over time.

Platanaceae
Family: Platanaceae,

Platanus
Genus Platanus:
 Platanus x acerifolia (Aiton) Willd. not indigenous, cultivated, naturalised

Proteaceae
Family: Proteaceae,

Aulax
Genus Aulax:
 Aulax cancellata (L.) Druce, endemic
 Aulax cneorifolia Salisb. ex Knight, accepted as Aulax umbellata (Thunb.) R.Br. indigenous
 Aulax pallasia Stapf, endemic
 Aulax pinifolia P.J.Bergius, accepted as Aulax cancellata (L.) Druce, indigenous
 Aulax umbellata (Thunb.) R.Br. endemic

Banksia
Genus Banksia:
 Banksia coccinea R.Br. not indigenous, cultivated, naturalised
 Banksia ericifolia L.f. not indigenous, cultivated, naturalised, invasive
 Banksia ericifolia L.f. subsp. ericifolia, not indigenous, cultivated, naturalised, invasive
 Banksia formosa (R.Br.) A.R.Mast & K.R.Thiele, not indigenous, cultivated, naturalised
 Banksia integrifolia L.f. not indigenous, cultivated, naturalised, invasive
 Banksia serrata L.f. not indigenous, cultivated, naturalised, invasive
 Banksia speciosa R.Br. not indigenous, cultivated, naturalised, invasive

Brabejum
Genus Brabejum:
 Brabejum stellatifolium L. endemic

Diastella
Genus Diastella:
 Diastella bryiflora Salisb. ex Knight, accepted as Diastella thymelaeoides (P.J.Bergius) Rourke subsp. thymelaeoides, indigenous
 Diastella buekii (Gand.) Rourke, endemic
 Diastella divaricata (P.J.Bergius) Rourke, indigenous
 Diastella divaricata (P.J.Bergius) Rourke subsp. divaricata, endemic
 Diastella divaricata (P.J.Bergius) Rourke subsp. montana Rourke, endemic
 Diastella ericaefolia Salisb. ex Knight, accepted as Diastella proteoides (L.) Druce, indigenous
 Diastella fraterna Rourke, endemic
 Diastella myrtifolia (Thunb.) Salisb. ex Knight, endemic
 Diastella parilis Salisb. ex Knight, endemic
 Diastella proteoides (L.) Druce, endemic
 Diastella serpyllifolia Salisb. ex Knight, accepted as Diastella divaricata (P.J.Bergius) Rourke subsp. montana Rourke, indigenous
 Diastella thymelaeoides (P.J.Bergius) Rourke, endemic
 Diastella thymelaeoides (P.J.Bergius) Rourke subsp. meridiana Rourke, endemic
 Diastella thymelaeoides (P.J.Bergius) Rourke subsp. thymelaeoides, endemic

Dryandra
Genus Dryandra:
 Dryandra formosa R.Br. accepted as Banksia formosa (R.Br.) A.R.Mast & K.R.Thiele, not indigenous, cultivated, naturalised

Faurea
Genus Faurea:
 Faurea decipiens C.H.Wright, accepted as Faurea rochetiana (A.Rich.) Chiov. ex Pic.Serm. indigenous
 Faurea galpinii E.Phillips, endemic
 Faurea macnaughtonii E.Phillips, indigenous
 Faurea natalensis E.Phillips, accepted as Faurea macnaughtonii E.Phillips, indigenous
 Faurea recondita Rourke & V.R.Clark, endemic
 Faurea rochetiana (A.Rich.) Chiov. ex Pic.Serm. indigenous
 Faurea rochetiana (A.Rich.) Chiov. ex Pic.Serm. subsp. speciosa (Welw.) Troupin, accepted as Faurea rochetiana (A.Rich.) Chiov. ex Pic.Serm. indigenous
 Faurea saligna Harv. indigenous
 Faurea saligna Harv. subsp. xanthoneura Merxm. accepted as Faurea saligna Harv. indigenous
 Faurea speciosa Welw. accepted as Faurea rochetiana (A.Rich.) Chiov. ex Pic.Serm. indigenous
 Faurea speciosa Welw. var. lanuginosa Hiern, accepted as Faurea rochetiana (A.Rich.) Chiov. ex Pic.Serm. indigenous

Grevillea
Genus Grevillea:
 Grevillea banksii R.Br. not indigenous, cultivated, naturalised, invasive
 Grevillea robusta A.Cunn. ex R.Br. not indigenous, cultivated, naturalised, invasive
 Grevillea rosmarinifolia A.Cunn. not indigenous, cultivated, naturalised, invasive

Hakea
Genus Hakea:
 Hakea acicularis (Vent.) Salisb. ex Knight, accepted as Hakea sericea Schrad. & J.C.Wendl. not indigenous, naturalised
 Hakea drupacea (C.F.Gaertn.) Roem. & Schult. not indigenous, naturalised, invasive
 Hakea gibbosa (Sm.) Cav. not indigenous, naturalised, invasive
 Hakea salicifolia (Vent.) B.L.Burtt, not indigenous, naturalised, invasive
 Hakea sericea Schrad. & J.C.Wendl. not indigenous, naturalised, invasive
 Hakea suaveolens R.Br. accepted as Hakea drupacea (C.F.Gaertn.) Roem. & Schult. not indigenous, naturalised
 Hakea victoria Drumm. not indigenous, cultivated, naturalised

Leucadendron
Genus Leucadendron:
 Leucadendron album (Thunb.) Fourc. endemic
 Leucadendron arcuatum (Lam.) I.Williams, endemic
 Leucadendron argenteum (L.) R.Br. endemic
 Leucadendron barkerae I.Williams, endemic
 Leucadendron bonum I.Williams, endemic
 Leucadendron brunioides Meisn. indigenous
 Leucadendron brunioides Meisn. var. brunioides, endemic
 Leucadendron brunioides Meisn. var. flumenlupinum I.Williams, endemic
 Leucadendron burchellii I.Williams, endemic
 Leucadendron cadens I.Williams, endemic
 Leucadendron chamelaea (Lam.) I.Williams, endemic
 Leucadendron cinereum (Sol. ex Aiton) R.Br. endemic
 Leucadendron comosum (Thunb.) R.Br. indigenous
 Leucadendron comosum (Thunb.) R.Br. subsp. comosum, endemic
 Leucadendron comosum (Thunb.) R.Br. subsp. homaeophyllum (Meisn.) I.Williams, endemic
 Leucadendron concavum I.Williams, endemic
 Leucadendron conicum (Lam.) I.Williams, endemic
 Leucadendron coniferum (L.) Meisn. endemic
 Leucadendron cordatum E.Phillips, endemic
 Leucadendron coriaceum E.Phillips & Hutch. endemic
 Leucadendron corymbosum P.J.Bergius, endemic
 Leucadendron cryptocephalum Guthrie, endemic
 Leucadendron daphnoides (Thunb.) Meisn. endemic
 Leucadendron diemontianum I.Williams, endemic
 Leucadendron discolor E.Phillips & Hutch. endemic
 Leucadendron dregei E.Mey. ex Meisn. endemic
 Leucadendron dubium (H.Buek ex Meisn.) E.Phillips & Hutch. endemic
 Leucadendron elimense E.Phillips, indigenous
 Leucadendron elimense E.Phillips subsp. elimense, endemic
 Leucadendron elimense E.Phillips subsp. salteri I.Williams, endemic
 Leucadendron elimense E.Phillips subsp. vyeboomense I.Williams, endemic
 Leucadendron ericifolium R.Br. endemic
 Leucadendron eucalyptifolium H.Buek ex Meisn. endemic
 Leucadendron flexuosum I.Williams, endemic
 Leucadendron floridum R.Br. endemic
 Leucadendron foedum I.Williams, endemic
 Leucadendron galpinii E.Phillips & Hutch. endemic
 Leucadendron gandogeri Schinz ex Gand. endemic
 Leucadendron glaberrimum (Schltr.) Compton, indigenous
 Leucadendron glaberrimum (Schltr.) Compton subsp. erubescens I.Williams, endemic
 Leucadendron glaberrimum (Schltr.) Compton subsp. glaberrimum, endemic
 Leucadendron globosum (Kenn. ex Andrews) I.Williams, endemic
 Leucadendron grandiflorum (Salisb.) R.Br. endemic
 Leucadendron gydoense I.Williams, endemic
 Leucadendron immoderatum Rourke, endemic
 Leucadendron lanigerum H.Buek ex Meisn. indigenous
 Leucadendron lanigerum H.Buek ex Meisn. var. laevigatum Meisn. endemic
 Leucadendron lanigerum H.Buek ex Meisn. var. lanigerum, endemic
 Leucadendron laureolum (Lam.) Fourc. endemic
 Leucadendron laxum I.Williams, endemic
 Leucadendron levisanus (L.) P.J.Bergius, endemic
 Leucadendron linifolium (Jacq.) R.Br. endemic
 Leucadendron loeriense I.Williams, endemic
 Leucadendron loranthifolium (Salisb. ex Knight) I.Williams, endemic
 Leucadendron macowanii E.Phillips, endemic
 Leucadendron meridianum I.Williams, endemic
 Leucadendron meyerianum H.Buek ex E.Phillips & Hutch. endemic
 Leucadendron microcephalum (Gand.) Gand. & Schinz, endemic
 Leucadendron modestum I.Williams, endemic
 Leucadendron muirii E.Phillips, endemic
 Leucadendron nervosum E.Phillips & Hutch. endemic
 Leucadendron nitidum H.Buek ex Meisn. endemic
 Leucadendron nobile I.Williams, endemic
 Leucadendron olens I.Williams, endemic
 Leucadendron orientale I.Williams, endemic
 Leucadendron osbornei Rourke, endemic
 Leucadendron platyspermum R.Br. endemic
 Leucadendron pondoense A.E.van Wyk, endemic
 Leucadendron procerum (Salisb. ex Knight) I.Williams, endemic
 Leucadendron pubescens R.Br. endemic
 Leucadendron pubibracteolatum I.Williams, endemic
 Leucadendron radiatum E.Phillips & Hutch. endemic
 Leucadendron remotum I.Williams, endemic
 Leucadendron roodii E.Phillips, endemic
 Leucadendron rourkei I.Williams, endemic
 Leucadendron rubrum Burm.f. endemic
 Leucadendron salicifolium (Salisb.) I.Williams, endemic
 Leucadendron salignum P.J.Bergius, endemic
 Leucadendron sericeum (Thunb.) R.Br. endemic
 Leucadendron sessile R.Br. endemic
 Leucadendron sheilae I.Williams, endemic
 Leucadendron singulare I.Williams, endemic
 Leucadendron sorocephalodes E.Phillips & Hutch. endemic
 Leucadendron spirale (Salisb. ex Knight) I.Williams, endemic
 Leucadendron spissifolium (Salisb. ex Knight) I.Williams, indigenous
 Leucadendron spissifolium (Salisb. ex Knight) I.Williams subsp. fragrans I.Williams, endemic
 Leucadendron spissifolium (Salisb. ex Knight) I.Williams subsp. natalense (Thode & Gilg) I.Williams, endemic
 Leucadendron spissifolium (Salisb. ex Knight) I.Williams subsp. oribinum I.Williams, endemic
 Leucadendron spissifolium (Salisb. ex Knight) I.Williams subsp. phillipsii (Hutch.) I.Williams, endemic
 Leucadendron spissifolium (Salisb. ex Knight) I.Williams subsp. spissifolium, endemic
 Leucadendron stellare (Sims) Sweet, endemic
 Leucadendron stelligerum I.Williams, endemic
 Leucadendron strobilinum (L.) Druce, endemic
 Leucadendron teretifolium (Andrews) I.Williams, endemic
 Leucadendron thymifolium (Salisb. ex Knight) I.Williams, endemic
 Leucadendron tinctum I.Williams, endemic
 Leucadendron tradouwense I.Williams, endemic
 Leucadendron uliginosum R.Br. indigenous
 Leucadendron uliginosum R.Br. subsp. glabratum I.Williams, endemic
 Leucadendron uliginosum R.Br. subsp. uliginosum, endemic
 Leucadendron verticillatum (Thunb.) Meisn. endemic
 Leucadendron xanthoconus (Kuntze) K.Schum. endemic

Leucospermum
Genus Leucospermum:
 Leucospermum alpinum (Salisb. ex Knight) Rourke, accepted as Vexatorella alpina (Salisb. ex Knight) Rourke, endemic
 Leucospermum alpinum (Salisb. ex Knight) Rourke subsp. amoenum Rourke, accepted as Vexatorella amoena (Rourke) Rourke, endemic
 Leucospermum arenarium Rycroft, endemic
 Leucospermum bolusii Gand. endemic
 Leucospermum calligerum (Salisb. ex Knight) Rourke, endemic
 Leucospermum catherinae Compton, endemic
 Leucospermum conocarpodendron (L.) H.Buek, indigenous
 Leucospermum conocarpodendron (L.) H.Buek subsp. conocarpodendron, endemic
 Leucospermum conocarpodendron (L.) H.Buek subsp. viridum Rourke, endemic
 Leucospermum cordatum E.Phillips, endemic
 Leucospermum cordifolium (Salisb. ex Knight) Fourc. endemic
 Leucospermum cuneiforme (Burm.f.) Rourke, endemic
 Leucospermum erubescens Rourke, endemic
 Leucospermum formosum (Andrews) Sweet, endemic
 Leucospermum fulgens Rourke, endemic
 Leucospermum gerrardii Stapf, endemic
 Leucospermum glabrum E.Phillips, endemic
 Leucospermum gracile (Salisb. ex Knight) Rourke, endemic
 Leucospermum grandiflorum (Salisb.) R.Br. endemic
 Leucospermum gueinzii Meisn. endemic
 Leucospermum hamatum Rourke, endemic
 Leucospermum harpagonatum Rourke, endemic
 Leucospermum heterophyllum (Thunb.) Rourke, endemic
 Leucospermum hypophyllocarpodendron (L.) Druce, indigenous
 Leucospermum hypophyllocarpodendron (L.) Druce subsp. canaliculatum (H.Buek ex Meisn.) Rourke, endemic
 Leucospermum hypophyllocarpodendron (L.) Druce subsp. hypophyllocarpodendron, endemic
 Leucospermum innovans Rourke, endemic
 Leucospermum lineare R.Br. endemic
 Leucospermum muirii E.Phillips, endemic
 Leucospermum mundii Meisn. endemic
 Leucospermum obtusatum (Thunb.) E.Phillips, accepted as Vexatorella obtusata (Thunb.) Rourke, endemic
 Leucospermum obtusatum (Thunb.) E.Phillips subsp. albomontanum Rourke, accepted as Vexatorella obtusata (Thunb.) Rourke subsp. albomontana (Rourke) Rourke, endemic
 Leucospermum oleifolium (P.J.Bergius) R.Br. endemic
 Leucospermum parile (Salisb. ex Knight) Sweet, endemic
 Leucospermum patersonii E.Phillips, endemic
 Leucospermum pedunculatum Klotzsch, endemic
 Leucospermum pluridens Rourke, endemic
 Leucospermum praecox Rourke, endemic
 Leucospermum praemorsum (Meisn.) E.Phillips, endemic
 Leucospermum profugum Rourke, endemic
 Leucospermum prostratum (Thunb.) Stapf, endemic
 Leucospermum reflexum H.Buek ex Meisn. indigenous
 Leucospermum reflexum H.Buek ex Meisn. var. luteum Rourke, endemic
 Leucospermum reflexum H.Buek ex Meisn. var. reflexum, endemic
 Leucospermum rochetianum A.Rich. accepted as Faurea rochetiana (A.Rich.) Chiov. ex Pic.Serm. indigenous
 Leucospermum rodolentum (Salisb. ex Knight) Rourke, endemic
 Leucospermum royenifolium (Salisb. ex Knight) Stapf, endemic
 Leucospermum saxatile (Salisb. ex Knight) Rourke, endemic
 Leucospermum saxosum S.Moore, indigenous
 Leucospermum secundifolium Rourke, endemic
 Leucospermum spathulatum R.Br. endemic
 Leucospermum tomentosum (Thunb.) R.Br. endemic
 Leucospermum tottum (L.) R.Br. indigenous
 Leucospermum tottum (L.) R.Br. var. glabrum E.Phillips, endemic
 Leucospermum tottum (L.) R.Br. var. tottum, endemic
 Leucospermum truncatulum (Salisb. ex Knight) Rourke, endemic
 Leucospermum truncatum (H.Buek ex Meisn.) Rourke, endemic
 Leucospermum utriculosum Rourke, endemic
 Leucospermum vestitum (Lam.) Rourke, endemic
 Leucospermum winteri Rourke, endemic
 Leucospermum wittebergense Compton, endemic

Macadamia
Genus Macadamia:
 Macadamia integrifolia Maiden & Betche, not indigenous, naturalised

Mimetes
Genus Mimetes:
 Mimetes arboreus Rourke, endemic
 Mimetes argenteus Salisb. ex Knight, endemic
 Mimetes capitulatus R.Br. endemic
 Mimetes chrysanthus Rourke, endemic
 Mimetes cucullatus (L.) R.Br. endemic
 Mimetes fimbriifolius Salisb. ex Knight, endemic
 Mimetes hirtus (L.) Salisb. ex Knight, endemic
 Mimetes hottentoticus E.Phillips & Hutch. endemic
 Mimetes palustris Salisb. ex Knight, endemic
 Mimetes pauciflorus R.Br. endemic
 Mimetes purpureus (L.) R.Br. accepted as Diastella proteoides (L.) Druce, indigenous
 Mimetes saxatilis E.Phillips, endemic
 Mimetes splendidus Salisb. ex Knight, endemic
 Mimetes stokoei E.Phillips & Hutch. endemic

Orothamnus
Genus Orothamnus:
 Orothamnus zeyheri Pappe ex Hook.f. endemic

Paranomus
Genus Paranomus:
 Paranomus abrotanifolius Salisb. ex Knight, endemic
 Paranomus adiantifolius Salisb. ex Knight, endemic
 Paranomus bolusii (Gand.) Levyns, endemic
 Paranomus bracteolaris Salisb. ex Knight, endemic
 Paranomus candicans (Thunb.) Kuntze, endemic
 Paranomus capitatus (R.Br.) Kuntze, endemic
 Paranomus centaureoides Levyns, endemic
 Paranomus concavus (Lam.) Kuntze, accepted as Diastella thymelaeoides (P.J.Bergius) Rourke subsp. thymelaeoides, indigenous
 Paranomus dispersus Levyns, endemic
 Paranomus dregei (H.Buek ex Meisn.) Kuntze, endemic
 Paranomus esterhuyseniae Levyns, endemic
 Paranomus lagopus (Thunb.) Salisb. endemic
 Paranomus longicaulis Salisb. ex Knight, endemic
 Paranomus reflexus (E.Phillips & Hutch.) Fourc. endemic
 Paranomus roodebergensis (Compton) Levyns, endemic
 Paranomus sceptrum-gustavianus (Sparrm.) Hyl. endemic
 Paranomus spathulatus (Thunb.) Kuntze, endemic
 Paranomus spicatus (P.J.Bergius) Kuntze, endemic
 Paranomus tomentosus (E.Phillips & Hutch.) N.E.Br. endemic

Protea
Genus Protea:
 Protea acaulos (L.) Reichard, endemic
 Protea acuminata Sims, endemic
 Protea amplexicaulis (Salisb.) R.Br. endemic
 Protea angustata R.Br. endemic
 Protea aristata E.Phillips, endemic
 Protea aspera E.Phillips, endemic
 Protea aurea (Burm.f.) Rourke, indigenous
 Protea aurea (Burm.f.) Rourke subsp. aurea, endemic
 Protea aurea (Burm.f.) Rourke subsp. potbergensis (Rourke) Rourke, endemic
 Protea burchellii Stapf, endemic
 Protea caespitosa Andrews, endemic
 Protea caffra Meisn. indigenous
 Protea caffra Meisn. subsp. caffra, indigenous
 Protea caffra Meisn. subsp. falcata (Beard) Lotter, endemic
 Protea canaliculata Andrews, endemic
 Protea compacta R.Br. endemic
 Protea comptonii Beard, indigenous
 Protea convexa E.Phillips, endemic
 Protea cordata Thunb. endemic
 Protea coronata Lam. endemic
 Protea cryophila Bolus, endemic
 Protea curvata N.E.Br. endemic
 Protea cynaroides (L.) L. endemic
 Protea decurrens E.Phillips, endemic
 Protea denticulata Rourke, endemic
 Protea dracomontana Beard, indigenous
 Protea effusa E.Mey. ex Meisn. endemic
 Protea eximia (Salisb. ex Knight) Fourc. endemic
 Protea foliosa Rourke, endemic
 Protea gaguedi J.F.Gmel. indigenous
 Protea glabra Thunb. endemic
 Protea grandiceps Tratt. endemic
 Protea holosericea (Salisb. ex Knight) Rourke, endemic
 Protea humiflora Andrews, endemic
 Protea inopina Rourke, endemic
 Protea intonsa Rourke, endemic
 Protea lacticolor Salisb. endemic
 Protea laetans L.E.Davidson, endemic
 Protea laevis R.Br. endemic
 Protea lanceolata E.Mey. ex Meisn. endemic
 Protea laurifolia Thunb. endemic
 Protea lepidocarpodendron (L.) L. endemic
 Protea longifolia Andrews, endemic
 Protea lorea R.Br. endemic
 Protea lorifolia (Salisb. ex Knight) Fourc. endemic
 Protea magnifica Link, endemic
 Protea montana E.Mey. ex Meisn. endemic
 Protea mucronifolia Salisb. endemic
 Protea mundii Klotzsch, endemic
 Protea namaquana Rourke, endemic
 Protea nana (P.J.Bergius) Thunb. endemic
 Protea neriifolia R.Br. endemic
 Protea nitida Mill. endemic
 Protea nubigena Rourke, endemic
 Protea obtusifolia H.Buek ex Meisn. endemic
 Protea odorata Thunb. endemic
 Protea parvula Beard, indigenous
 Protea pendula R.Br. endemic
 Protea piscina Rourke, endemic
 Protea pityphylla E.Phillips, endemic
 Protea pityphylla E.Phillips var. latifolia E.Phillips, accepted as Protea hybrid, present
 Protea pruinosa Rourke, endemic
 Protea pudens Rourke, endemic
 Protea punctata Meisn. endemic
 Protea recondita H.Buek ex Meisn. endemic
 Protea repens (L.) L. endemic
 Protea restionifolia (Salisb. ex Knight) Rycroft, endemic
 Protea revoluta R.Br. endemic
 Protea roupelliae Meisn. indigenous
 Protea roupelliae Meisn. subsp. hamiltonii Beard ex Rourke, endemic
 Protea roupelliae Meisn. subsp. roupelliae, indigenous
 Protea rubropilosa Beard, endemic
 Protea rupicola Mund ex Meisn. endemic
 Protea scabra R.Br. endemic
 Protea scabriuscula E.Phillips, endemic
 Protea scolopendriifolia (Salisb. ex Knight) Rourke, endemic
 Protea scolymocephala (L.) Reichard, endemic
 Protea scorzonerifolia (Salisb. ex Knight) Rycroft, endemic
 Protea simplex E.Phillips, indigenous
 Protea speciosa (L.) L. endemic
 Protea stipitata E.Phillips, accepted as Protea caffra Meisn. subsp. caffra, present
 Protea stokoei E.Phillips, endemic
 Protea subulifolia (Salisb. ex Knight) Rourke, endemic
 Protea subvestita N.E.Br. indigenous
 Protea sulphurea E.Phillips, endemic
 Protea susannae E.Phillips, endemic
 Protea tenax (Salisb.) R.Br. endemic
 Protea venusta Compton, endemic
 Protea vogtsiae Rourke, endemic
 Protea welwitschii Engl. indigenous
 Protea welwitschii Engl. subsp. glabrescens (Beard) Beard, accepted as Protea welwitschii Engl. indigenous
 Protea welwitschii Engl. subsp. goetzeana (Engl.) Beard, accepted as Protea welwitschii Engl. indigenous
 Protea welwitschii Engl. subsp. hirta Beard, accepted as Protea welwitschii Engl. present
 Protea welwitschii Engl. var. glabrescens (Beard) Beard, accepted as Protea welwitschii Engl. indigenous
 Protea witzenbergiana E.Phillips, endemic

Serruria
Genus Serruria:
 Serruria acrocarpa R.Br. endemic
 Serruria adscendens (Lam.) R.Br. endemic
 Serruria aemula Salisb. ex Knight, endemic
 Serruria aitonii R.Br. endemic
 Serruria altiscapa Rourke, endemic
 Serruria balanocephala Rourke, endemic
 Serruria bolusii E.Phillips & Hutch. endemic
 Serruria brevifolia E.Phillips & Hutch. accepted as Paranomus capitatus (R.Br.) Kuntze, present
 Serruria brownii Meisn. endemic
 Serruria callosa Salisb. ex Knight, endemic
 Serruria candicans R.Br. endemic
 Serruria collina Salisb. ex Knight, endemic
 Serruria confragosa Rourke, endemic
 Serruria cyanoides (L.) R.Br. endemic
 Serruria cygnea R.Br. endemic
 Serruria decipiens R.Br. endemic
 Serruria decumbens (Thunb.) R.Br. endemic
 Serruria deluvialis Rourke, endemic
 Serruria diffusa R.Br. accepted as Serruria furcellata R.Br. present
 Serruria dodii E.Phillips & Hutch. endemic
 Serruria effusa Rourke, endemic
 Serruria elongata (P.J.Bergius) R.Br. endemic
 Serruria fasciflora Salisb. ex Knight, endemic
 Serruria flagellifolia Salisb. ex Knight, endemic
 Serruria flava Meisn. endemic
 Serruria florida (Thunb.) Salisb. ex Knight, endemic
 Serruria fucifolia Salisb. ex Knight, endemic
 Serruria furcellata R.Br. endemic
 Serruria glomerata (L.) R.Br. endemic
 Serruria gracilis Salisb. ex Knight, accepted as Serruria pinnata (Andr.) R.Br. present
 Serruria gremialis Rourke, endemic
 Serruria heterophylla Meisn. endemic
 Serruria hirsuta R.Br. endemic
 Serruria inconspicua L.Guthrie & T.M.Salter, endemic
 Serruria incrassata Meisn. endemic
 Serruria kraussii Meisn. endemic
 Serruria lacunosa Rourke, endemic
 Serruria leipoldtii E.Phillips & Hutch. endemic
 Serruria linearis Salisb. ex Knight, endemic
 Serruria meisneriana Schltr. endemic
 Serruria millefolia Salisb. ex Knight, endemic
 Serruria nervosa Meisn. endemic
 Serruria nivenii R.Br. endemic
 Serruria pedunculata (Lam.) R.Br. endemic
 Serruria phylicoides (P.J.Bergius) R.Br. endemic
 Serruria pinnata (Andr.) R.Br. endemic
 Serruria plumosa Meisn. accepted as Serruria nivenii R.Br. present
 Serruria rebeloi Rourke, endemic
 Serruria reflexa Rourke, endemic
 Serruria rosea E.Phillips, endemic
 Serruria rostellaris Salisb. ex Knight, endemic
 Serruria roxburghii R.Br. endemic
 Serruria rubricaulis R.Br. endemic
 Serruria scariosa R.Br. accepted as Serruria nivenii R.Br. present
 Serruria scoparia R.Br. endemic
 Serruria stellata Rourke, endemic
 Serruria trilopha Salisb. ex Knight, endemic
 Serruria triternata (Thunb.) R.Br. endemic
 Serruria ventricosa E.Phillips & Hutch. accepted as Serruria nervosa Meisn. present
 Serruria villosa (Lam.) R.Br. endemic
 Serruria viridifolia Rourke, endemic
 Serruria williamsii Rourke, endemic
 Serruria zeyheri Meisn. endemic

Sorocephalus
Genus Sorocephalus:
 Sorocephalus alopecurus Rourke, endemic
 Sorocephalus capitatus Rourke, endemic
 Sorocephalus clavigerus (Salisb. ex Knight) Hutch. endemic
 Sorocephalus crassifolius Hutch. endemic
 Sorocephalus imbricatus (Thunb.) R.Br. endemic
 Sorocephalus lanatus (Thunb.) R.Br. endemic
 Sorocephalus palustris Rourke, endemic
 Sorocephalus pinifolius (Salisb. ex Knight) Rourke, endemic
 Sorocephalus scabridus Meisn. endemic
 Sorocephalus tenuifolius R.Br. endemic
 Sorocephalus teretifolius (Meisn.) E.Phillips, endemic

Spatalla
Genus Spatalla:
 Spatalla argentea Rourke, endemic
 Spatalla barbigera Salisb. ex Knight, endemic
 Spatalla caudata (Thunb.) R.Br. endemic
 Spatalla colorata Meisn. endemic
 Spatalla confusa (E.Phillips) Rourke, endemic
 Spatalla curvifolia Salisb. ex Knight, endemic
 Spatalla ericoides E.Phillips, endemic
 Spatalla incurva (Thunb.) R.Br. endemic
 Spatalla longifolia Salisb. ex Knight, endemic
 Spatalla mollis R.Br. endemic
 Spatalla nubicola Rourke, endemic
 Spatalla parilis Salisb. ex Knight, endemic
 Spatalla prolifera (Thunb.) Salisb. ex Knight, endemic
 Spatalla propinqua R.Br. endemic
 Spatalla racemosa (L.) Druce, endemic
 Spatalla salsoloides (R.Br.) Rourke, endemic
 Spatalla setacea (R.Br.) Rourke, endemic
 Spatalla squamata Meisn. endemic
 Spatalla thyrsiflora Salisb. ex Knight, endemic
 Spatalla tulbaghensis (E.Phillips) Rourke, endemic

Telopea
Genus Telopea:
 Telopea speciosissima (Sm.) R.Br. not indigenous, cultivated, naturalised

Vexatorella
Genus Vexatorella:
 Vexatorella alpina (Salisb. ex Knight) Rourke, endemic
 Vexatorella amoena (Rourke) Rourke, endemic
 Vexatorella latebrosa Rourke, endemic
 Vexatorella obtusata (Thunb.) Rourke, indigenous
 Vexatorella obtusata (Thunb.) Rourke subsp. albomontana (Rourke) Rourke, endemic
 Vexatorella obtusata (Thunb.) Rourke subsp. obtusata, endemic

References

South African plant biodiversity lists
Proteales